Mehdi Messaoudi (born February 12, 1990) is a Moroccan Greco-Roman wrestler. He competed in the men's Greco-Roman 59 kg event at the 2016 Summer Olympics, in which he was eliminated in the round of 16 by Jesse Thielke.

References

External links
 

1990 births
Living people
Moroccan male sport wrestlers
Olympic wrestlers of Morocco
Wrestlers at the 2016 Summer Olympics